MS Henrik Ibsen is a historic Norwegian diesel-powered ship built in 1907. Together with MS Victoria, it sails on the Telemark Canal  in Norway between Skien and Dalen in the summer. The ship was built by Eriksbergs Mekaniska Verkstad in Gothenburg, Sweden in 1907 and named SS Styrsö. The ship was operated in the Gothenburg archipelago until 1970, and after that she was used as charter ship.

After being adapted to canal traffic, the ship arrived at Telemark Canal in 1992. She was renamed MS Henrik Ibsen after the former steamship SS Henrik Ibsen, which also operated on the Telemark Canal from 1907 to 1919. From 1999 until 2010 the ship was owned and operated by Skien Dalen Skipsselskap AS.

The ship was thereafter sold to the Telemarkskanalen Skipsselskap AS, owned by Thor Morten Halvorsen, who also owns Dalen Hotel. Upgrading of the ship was carried out at the Hansen & Arntzen shipyard in Stathelle and by boatbuilder Geir Røvik in Tønsberg. After a complete restoration new operations on the Telemark Canal began in mid-2010.

References

External links 

 Homepage of MS Henrik Ibsen
 Historic ships in Telemark: M/S Henrik Ibsen
 Dalen Hotel Telemark
 Telemark Canal

1907 ships
Passenger ships of Norway
Merchant ships of Norway
Ships built in Gothenburg
1907 in Sweden